Carpornis, the berryeaters, is a genus of birds in the family Cotingidae. These primarily frugivorous birds are endemic to the southern half of the Atlantic forest (eastern Brazil).

The genus contains two species. Both species are mainly greenish-yellow with a black hood. The genus is sister to the genus Snowornis that contains two pihas.

References

 
 
Taxonomy articles created by Polbot
Taxa named by George Robert Gray